Merima Kurtiš (9 November 1953 – 20 November 2021), known professionally as Merima Njegomir, was a Serbian folk and sevdah singer.

Life 
She began her career singing many interpretations of popular Bosnian folk songs, such as "Moj dilbere" and "Sejdefu majka buđaše", which gained her popularity across Serbia and former Yugoslavia. Her career, spanning over four decades, includes 24 albums, and songs in over 20 languages, such as Hungarian, Hebrew, Italian, Greek and Turkish. Her father Adem was a Macedonian Albanian from Ohrid, while her mother Fatima was a Bosniak from Bijeljina.

Njegomir is best known for her distinct mezzo-soprano vocal range, and folk songs with influences from her native Zemun. She remains one of the most prominent names in Serbian music, with many songs achieving popularity in Eastern Europe, from Slovenia to Russia. One of her more notable songs is "Ivanova korita", which, as a 2005 release, was covered by numerous artists, including the Croatian music act Fijakeri. The single was published yet again in 2012, as a rendition, which included various elements of modern turbo-folk. Its third release was as a part of the album Pjesme iz Crne Gore (Songs from Montenegro).

Although Njegomir is most famous for providing vocals for Serbian folk songs, her music style includes jazz, classical, pop, and Romani music.

Njegomir died of pancreatic cancer on 20 November 2021.

References

External links
 
 

1953 births
2021 deaths
People from Zemun
Serbian folk-pop singers
Serbian folk singers
20th-century Serbian women singers
Serbian people of Albanian descent 
Serbian people of Macedonian descent 
Serbian people of Bosniak descent
Yugoslav women singers